Mäls is a village of Liechtenstein, located in the municipality of Balzers.

Geography
The village, contiguous with Balzers, is located next to the river Rhine and to the borders of Switzerland.

References

Villages of Liechtenstein
Balzers
Liechtenstein–Switzerland border crossings